Quetin Head is a rock headland  southwest of Cape Phillips, Daniell Peninsula, Borchgrevink Coast. The headland rises to 900 m and marks the eastern extent of Mandible Cirque. Named by the Advisory Committee on Antarctic Names in 2005 after Langdon B. Quetin and Robin Macurda Ross-Quetin, Marine Science Institute, University of California, Santa Barbara, collaborators in United States Antarctic Program ecological research in the Southern Ocean for 14 field seasons, from 1991 to 2004.

References

Cliffs of Victoria Land